Baccharis fusca is a species of flowering plant in the family Asteraceae that is endemic to Ecuador. Its natural habitat is subtropical or tropical moist montane forests. It is threatened by habitat destruction.

References

fusca
Endemic flora of Ecuador
Flora of Esmeraldas Province
Critically endangered flora of South America
Taxonomy articles created by Polbot
Taxa named by Nikolai Turczaninow